The Siamese fireback (Lophura diardi), also known as Diard's fireback, is a fairly large, approximately  long, pheasant. The male has a grey plumage with an extensive facial caruncle, crimson legs and feet, ornamental black crest feathers, reddish brown iris and long curved blackish tail. The female is a brown bird with blackish wing and tail feathers.

The Siamese fireback is distributed to the lowland and evergreen forests of Cambodia, Laos, Thailand and Vietnam in Southeast Asia. This species is also designated as the national bird of Thailand. The female usually lays between four and eight rosy eggs.

Naming

The scientific name commemorates the French naturalist Pierre-Médard Diard.

This species of pheasant has a common name in Thai Kai Fah Phaya Lo (Lord Lo's pheasant), according to Thai folk literature, Lilit Phra Lo where Phra Lo, the protagonist, is charmed by following the pheasant until he meets Phra Phuean and Phra Phaeng, the two sisters and later his lovers.

Status
Due to habitat loss and over-hunting in some areas, the Siamese fireback was evaluated as Near Threatened on the IUCN Red List, however, it is now Least Concern.

Gallery

See also 
 National symbols of Thailand

References

External links 

 BirdLife Species Factsheet
 Red Data Book
Ebird

Siamese fireback
Birds of Laos
Birds of Vietnam
Birds of Cambodia
Birds of Thailand
Birds of Indochina
Siamese fireback
National symbols of Thailand
Siamese fireback